Sarcasm is the caustic use of words, often in a humorous way, to mock someone or something. Sarcasm may employ ambivalence, although it is not necessarily ironic. Most noticeable in spoken word, sarcasm is mainly distinguished by the inflection with which it is spoken or, with an undercurrent of irony, by the extreme disproportion of the comment to the situation, and is largely context-dependent.

Etymology 

The word comes from the Greek σαρκασμός (sarkasmós) which is taken from σαρκάζειν (sarkázein) meaning "to tear flesh, bite the lip in rage, sneer".

It is first recorded in English in 1579, in an annotation to The Shepheardes Calender by Edmund Spenser:

However, the word sarcastic, meaning "Characterized by or involving sarcasm; given to the use of sarcasm; bitterly cutting or caustic", doesn't appear until 1695.

Usage 

In its entry on irony, Dictionary.com describes sarcasm thus:

In sarcasm, ridicule or mockery is used harshly, often crudely and contemptuously, for destructive purposes. It may be used in an indirect manner, and have the form of irony, as in "What a fine musician you turned out to be!," "It's like you're a whole different person now...," and "Oh... Well then thanks for all the first aid over the years!" or it may be used in the form of a direct statement, "You couldn't play one piece correctly if you had two assistants." The distinctive quality of sarcasm is present in the spoken word and manifested chiefly by vocal inflection ...

Distinguishing sarcasm from banter, and referring to the use of irony in sarcasm, Derek Bousfield writes that sarcasm is: The use of strategies which, on the surface appear to be appropriate to the situation, but are meant to be taken as meaning the opposite in terms of face management. That is, the utterance which appears, on the surface, to maintain or enhance the face of the recipient actually attacks and damages the face of the recipient. ... sarcasm is an insincere form of politeness which is used to offend one's interlocutor.

17.'Never a truer word said in jest': A Pragmastylistic Analysis of Impoliteness as Banter in Henry IV, Part I, Derek Bousfield (University of Huddersfield, UK)

John Haiman writes: "There is an extremely close connection between sarcasm and irony, and literary theorists in particular often treat sarcasm as simply the crudest and least interesting form of irony." Also, he adds:
First, situations may be ironic, but only people can be sarcastic. Second, people may be unintentionally ironic, but sarcasm requires intention. What is essential to sarcasm is that it is overt irony intentionally used by the speaker as a form of verbal aggression.

While Henry Watson Fowler writes:
Sarcasm does not necessarily involve irony. But irony, or the use of expressions conveying different things according as they are interpreted, is so often made the vehicle of sarcasm ... The essence of sarcasm is the intention of giving pain by (ironical or other) bitter words.

In psychology
Professionals in psychology and related fields have long looked upon sarcasm negatively, particularly noting that sarcasm tends to be a maladaptive coping mechanism for those with unresolved anger or frustrations. Psychologist Clifford N. Lazarus describes sarcasm as "hostility disguised as humor". While an occasional sarcastic comment may enliven a conversation, Lazarus suggests that too frequent use of sarcasm tends to "overwhelm the emotional flavor of any conversation".

Understanding 
  
Understanding the subtlety of this usage requires second-order interpretation of the speaker's or writer's intentions; different parts of the brain must work together to understand sarcasm. This sophisticated understanding can be lacking in some people with certain forms of brain damage, dementia and sometimes autism, and this perception has been located by MRI in the right parahippocampal gyrus. Research on the anatomy of sarcasm has shown, according to Richard Delmonico, a neuropsychologist at University of California, Davis, that people with damage in the prefrontal cortex have difficulty understanding non-verbal aspects of language like tone. Neuroscientist David Salmon at the University of California, San Diego, stated that this type of research could help doctors distinguish between different types of neurodegenerative diseases, such as frontotemporal dementia and Alzheimer's disease.

In William Brant's Critique of Sarcastic Reason, sarcasm is hypothesized to develop as a cognitive and emotional tool that adolescents use in order to test the borders of politeness and truth in conversation. Sarcasm recognition and expression both require the development of understanding forms of language, especially if sarcasm occurs without a cue or signal (e.g., a sarcastic tone or rolling the eyes). Sarcasm is argued to be more sophisticated than lying because lying is expressed as early as the age of three, but sarcastic expressions take place much later during development (Brant, 2012). According to Brant (2012, 145–6), sarcasm is

Cultural perspectives on sarcasm vary widely with more than a few cultures and linguistic groups finding it offensive to varying degrees. Thomas Carlyle despised it: "Sarcasm I now see to be, in general, the language of the devil; for which reason I have long since as good as renounced it". Fyodor Dostoevsky, on the other hand, recognized in it a cry of pain: Sarcasm, he said, was "usually the last refuge of modest and chaste-souled people when the privacy of their soul is coarsely and intrusively invaded." RFC 1855, a collection of guidelines for Internet communications, includes a warning to be especially careful with it as it "may not travel well." Another study of sarcasm over email verifies these claims. A professional translator has advised that international business executives "should generally avoid sarcasm in intercultural business conversations and written communications" because of the difficulties in translating sarcasm.

A 2015 study by L. Huang, F. Gino and A.D. Galinsky of the Harvard Business School "tests a novel theoretical model in which both the construction and interpretation of sarcasm lead to greater creativity because they activate abstract thinking."

Vocal indication 

In English, sarcasm is often telegraphed with kinesic/prosodic cues by speaking more slowly and with a lower pitch. Similarly, Dutch uses a lowered pitch; sometimes to such an extent that the expression is reduced to a mere mumble. But other research shows that there are many ways that real speakers signal sarcastic intentions. One study found that in Cantonese, sarcasm is indicated by raising the fundamental frequency of one's voice. In Amharic, rising intonation is used to show sarcasm.

Punctuation 

Though in the English language there isn't any standard accepted method to denote irony or sarcasm in written conversation, several forms of punctuation have been proposed. Among the oldest and frequently attested are the percontation point—furthered by Henry Denham in the 1580s—and the irony mark—furthered by Alcanter de Brahm in the 19th century. Both of these marks were represented visually by a ⸮ backwards question mark (unicode U+2E2E). Each of these punctuation marks are primarily used to indicate that a sentence should be understood as ironic, but not necessarily designate sarcasm that is not ironic. By contrast, more recent proposals, such as the snark mark, or the use of a following tilde are specifically intended to denote sarcasm rather than irony. A bracketed exclamation point or question mark as well as scare quotes are also sometimes used to express irony or ironic sarcasm.

In certain Ethiopic languages, sarcasm and unreal phrases are indicated at the end of a sentence with a sarcasm mark called temherte slaq, a character that looks like an inverted exclamation point ¡. The usage directly parallels John Wilkins' 1668 proposal to use the inverted exclamation point as an irony mark. A proposal by Asteraye Tsigie and Daniel Yacob in 1999 to include the temherte slaq in unicode was unsuccessful.

Sarcasm and irony 

While sarcasm (harsh ridicule or mockery) is often directly associated with verbal irony (meaning the opposite of what is said) and the two are frequently used together; sarcasm is not necessarily ironic by definition, and either element can be used without the other.

Examples of sarcasm and irony used together:

"My you're early!" (After one arrives extremely late).

"What a fine artist you've become!" (When meaning to express displeasure).

Example of sarcasm without irony: (frequently attributed to Winston Churchill)

After an onlooker comments on one being drunk: "My dear, tomorrow I will be sober, and you will still be ugly!"

Example of irony without sarcasm:

After a popular teacher apologizes to the class for answering his phone in the other room: "I don't know if we can forgive you!"

Identifying 
A French company has developed an analytics tool that claims to have up to 80% accuracy in identifying sarcastic comments posted online.

In June 2014, the United States Secret Service requested bids for software that would identify sarcasm in tweets.

In religion 
The Buddhist monk Ṭhānissaro Bhikkhu has identified sarcasm as contrary to right speech, an aspect of the Noble Eightfold Path leading to the end of suffering. He opines that sarcasm is an unskillful and unwholesome method of humor, which he contrasts with an approach based on frankly highlighting the ironies inherent in life.

See also 

 Facetiousness 
 Guiltive
 Hyperbole
 Irony
 Oxymoron
 Paradox
 Poe's law
 Sardonicism
 Smirk
 Snarl
 Sneer
 Tongue-in-cheek
 Witticism

References

External links 

 BBC News Magazine - The rules of sarcasm

Humour
Figures of speech
Rhetoric
Irony